Russell Ferguson McLeod (July 29, 1906 – April 1977) was an American football lineman. He played 3 games in the National Football League (NFL) for the St. Louis Gunners. He was born in Cypress River, Manitoba, Canada, and played college football at Saint Louis University.

External links
 
Database Football
Russ McLeod's profile at NFL.com

1906 births
1977 deaths
Gridiron football people from Manitoba
Saint Louis University alumni
American football offensive linemen
Canadian players of American football
Cincinnati Reds (NFL) players
St. Louis Gunners players